The Rolls-Royce Gnome is a British turboshaft engine originally developed by the de Havilland Engine Company as a licence-built General Electric T58, an American mid-1950s design. The Gnome came to Rolls-Royce after their takeover of Bristol Siddeley in 1968, Bristol having absorbed de Havilland Engines Limited in 1961.

A licence to manufacture the T58 was purchased in 1958. The T58 had begun bench testing in 1955 and by 1958 had already been used in helicopters and de Havilland were able to test their first engines in a Westland Whirlwind and Wasp helicopters in August 1959 and March 1960 respectively.

A free-turbine turboshaft, it was used in helicopters such as the Westland Sea King and Westland Whirlwind. The design was sub-licensed to Alfa-Romeo.

There were two series produced: the "H" turboshaft for helicopter use, and the "P" turboprop for fixed-wing aircraft.

Design and development
A two-stage turbine drives the 10 stage all-axial compressor, whilst a single-stage free power turbine drives the load.
 The combustor is annular. The Gnome differed from the T-58 in having a British developed fuel control system (Lucas).

Because an all-axial design is employed, the final stage compressor rotor blades are amongst the smallest ever manufactured. Normally, a small engine such as this would feature an axial/centrifugal or even a double centrifugal compressor.

The engine was the first developed with a full authority analogue computer, de Havilland Propellers' own, as part of the fuel control system, specifically to anticipate helicopter power demand from pilot control inputs and to limit fuel flow during acceleration to prevent engine surge from occurring. The system developed relieved the helicopter pilot of the need to control rotor speed directly; it delivered constant rotor speed under varying rotor load. and in this way was the analogue forerunner of all subsequent full authority digital engine control (FADEC) systems worldwide.

Variants
H.1000 (Mk.101) , first production version for use on later marks of Westland Whirlwind
H.1400  for the Westland Sea King HAS.1
H.1400-1 , uprated from the 1400 by increasing the gas-generator speed and using improved blades that can operate at higher temperatures for the Westland Sea King HAS.2.
H.1400-1TFor the Westland Commando HC.4 troop carrier variant of the Westland Sea King
H.1400-2  for the Westland Sea King HAS.5.
H.1400-3  with new two-stage power turbine.
H.1600 11-stage compressor with 2-stage free power turbine 
P.1000Turboprop version of the H.1000
P.1200Turboprop version of the H.1200
Gnome Mk.101
Gnome Mk.110 Handed H.1200 engines for Coupled Gnome units used in Westland Wessex helicopters.
Gnome Mk.111 Handed H.1200 engines for Coupled Gnome units used in Westland Wessex helicopters.
Gnome Mk.112 Handed H.1200 engines for Coupled Gnome units used in Westland Wessex HU.5 helicopters.
Gnome Mk.113 Handed H.1200 engines for Coupled Gnome units used in Westland Wessex HU.5 helicopters.
Gnome Mk.501Civilianised H.1000.
Gnome Mk.510Civilianised H.1000.
Gnome Mk.610Civilianised H.1200.
Gnome Mk.640Civilianised H.1200.
Gnome Mk.640ACivilianised H.1200.
Gnome Mk 660 Used in the civilian Westland Wessex 60 helicopter variant of Wessex HC.2
Coupled GnomeTwin engines driving through a common gearbox to a single output.

Applications
 Agusta A.101
 AgustaBell AB204B
 Agusta-Bell 205BG
 Kawasaki KV-107 (Swedish Navy only)
 Saunders-Roe SR.N5 hovercraft
 Saunders-Roe SR.N6 hovercraft
 Vertol 107
 Westland Sea King and Commando
 Westland Wessex
 Westland Whirlwind

Engines on display

Rolls-Royce Gnome engines are on display at the following museums:

 Caernarfon Airworld Aviation Museum
 de Havilland Aircraft Heritage Centre
 The Helicopter Museum (Weston)
 Imperial War Museum Duxford
 London Science Museum
 South Yorkshire Aircraft Museum

Specifications (Gnome H1400-1)

See also

References

Notes

Bibliography

 Gunston, Bill. World Encyclopedia of Aero Engines. Cambridge, England. Patrick Stephens Limited, 1989. 
 Taylor, John W.R. Jane's All the World's Aircraft 1982-83., London, Jane's Publishing Company Ltd, 1982. .

External links

 de Havilland engines

1950s turboshaft engines
Gnome
Gnome
Axial-compressor gas turbine engines